A penumbral lunar eclipse took place on Monday, September 4, 1933. This subtle penumbral eclipse may have been visible to a skilled observer at maximum eclipse. 70% of the Moon's disc was partially shaded by the Earth (none of it was in total shadow), which caused a gentle shadow gradient across its disc at maximum; the eclipse as a whole lasted 3 hours and 41 minutes.

Visibility

Related lunar eclipses

See also 
List of lunar eclipses and List of 21st-century lunar eclipses

External links 
 Saros series 146
 

1933-09
1933 in science